Puerto Almanza is a small village settlement in Tierra del Fuego on the northern shore of the Beagle Channel. It lies about 3 km west from another settlement on the channel called Almirante Brown and its almost opposite to the Chilean port of Puerto Williams.

Mostly a resting point for fishermen and access point to some local ranches in Tierra del Fuego when roads are cut due to bad weather. Its population is approximately 100 inhabitants. It is the southernmost village of Argentina.

To reach Puerto Almanza by road one should set off from Ushuaia traveling east via the 'Ruta Nacional 3' for approximately 71 km until reaching road 'J', which is the road that takes you back down to the channel, where you continue west on road 'K' for about 5 km to reach Puerto Almanza.

References

Cities and towns in Tierra del Fuego
Populated places in Tierra del Fuego Province, Argentina